Nikkitasha Marwaha won Miss India Worldwide 2009 at Durban, South Africa on February 14, 2009. She was a contestant on Dance India Dance season two. She placed First Runner-up on NDTV's Hunt for the Kingfisher Calendar Girl in 2013.

She performed as the assassin 'Mehr' in Anil Kapoor's  released 24 (Indian TV series) on Colors.

Marwaha is from the state of Virginia, in the DC Metropolitan area. She grew up in Fairfax, Virginia, where she attended Greenbriar West Elementary School, Lanier Middle School, and Robinson Secondary School. She completed the IB Diploma candidate program in 2008 and went on to study at Northwestern University in Evanston, Illinois.

References

1989 births
Living people
American beauty pageant winners